Bryges or Briges is the historical name given to a people of the ancient Balkans. They are generally considered to have been related to the Phrygians, who during classical antiquity lived in western Anatolia. Both names, Bryges and Phrygians, are assumed to be variants of the same root. Based on archaeological evidence, some scholars such as Nicholas Hammond and Eugene N. Borza argue that the Bryges/Phrygians were members of the Lusatian culture that migrated into the southern Balkans during the Late Bronze Age.

History
 
The earliest mentions of the Bryges are contained in the historical writings of Herodotus, who relates them to Phrygians, stating that according to the Macedonians, the Bryges "changed their name" to Phryges after migrating into Anatolia, a movement which is thought to have happened between 1200 BC and 800 BC perhaps due to the Bronze Age collapse, particularly the fall of the Hittite Empire and the power vacuum that was created. In the Balkans, the Bryges occupied central Albania and some parts of northern Epirus, as well as Macedonia, mainly west of the Axios river, but also Mygdonia, which was conquered by the kingdom of Macedon in the early 5th century BC. They seem to have lived peacefully next to the inhabitants of Macedonia. However, Eugammon in his Telegony, drawing upon earlier epic traditions, mentions that Odysseus commanded the Epirotian Thesprotians against the Bryges. Small groups of Bryges, after the migration to Anatolia and the expansion of the kingdom of Macedon, were still left in northern Pelagonia and around Epidamnus.

Herodotus also mentions that in 492 BC, some Thracian Brygoi or Brygians (Greek: Βρύγοι Θρήικες) fell upon the Persian camp by night, wounding Mardonius himself, though he went on with the campaign until he subdued them. These Brygoi were later mentioned in Plutarch's Parallel Lives, in the Battle of Philippi, as camp servants of Brutus. However, modern scholars state that a historical link between them and the original Bryges cannot be established.

Etymology

There is no certain derivation for the name and tribal origin of the Bryges. In 1844, Hermann Müller suggested the name might be related to the same Indo-European root as that of Slavic Breg (shore, hill, slope, mountain), German Berg (mountain) i.e. IE *bʰerǵʰ. It would then be cognate with Western European tribal names such as the Celtic Brigantes and the Germanic Burgundians, and semantically motivated by some aspect of the word meanings "high, elevated, noble, illustrious".

Proper names
Some personal or geographic names mentioned in ancient authors may be etymologically related to "Bryges":

Brygean islands in the supposed Adriatic delta of Istros, mentioned in the Argonautica, an epic poem.
Brygias or Brygium, a city in Lychnitis palus.
Brygos (son of Aphrodisios) eponym in Epidamnos/Dyrrhachion.
Brygos (Attic potter, 5th century BC).
Brygindara (city), Brygindis (local goddess), Brygindarios (citizen) in Rhodes island.

Language

See also
Phrygia
Armeno-Phrygian
Moschoi
Macedonia
Thrace
Phrygian cap

References

See also
 Anfosso, Milena. "The Phrygians from Βρίγες to Φρύγες: Herodotus 7.73, or the Linguistic Problems of a Migration”. In: Proceedings of the 31st Annual UCLA Indo-European Conference. November 8th and 9th, 2019. Eds. Goldstein, D. M., Jamison, S. W., Vine, B.). Bremen: Hempen Verlag, 2020. pp. 17–35.

Ancient tribes in the Balkans
Phrygia
Anatolia
Thraco-Illyrian
Ancient tribes in Macedonia
Ancient tribes in Albania
Ancient tribes in Epirus
Iron Age Greece